The 2012 WNBA season is the 16th season for the San Antonio Silver Stars franchise of the Women's National Basketball Association. It is their 10th in San Antonio.

Transactions

WNBA Draft
The following are the Silver Stars' selections in the 2012 WNBA Draft.

Transaction log
April 11, 2011: The Silver Stars traded second- and third-round picks in the 2012 Draft to the Tulsa Shock in exchange for Scholanda Robinson.
February 8: The Silver Stars signed Shameka Christon.
February 16: The Silver Stars signed Ify Ibekwe, Kalisha Keane and Latoya Williams.
February 27: The Silver Stars signed Ziomara Morrison.
March 1: The Silver Stars traded Roneeka Hodges to the Indiana Fever in exchange for Tangela Smith.
March 27: The Silver Stars signed Loree Moore.
April 23: The Silver Stars signed Cierra Bravard and draft pick Shenise Johnson.
April 30: The Silver Stars waived Ify Ibekwe.
May 7: The Silver Stars waived Latoya Williams.
May 14: The Silver Stars waived Cierra Bravard.
May 15: The Silver Stars waived Kalisha Keane.
May 16: The Silver Stars waived Loree Moore and Porsha Phillips.

Trades

Personnel changes

Additions

Subtractions

Roster

Depth

Season standings

Schedule

Preseason

|- align="center" bgcolor="ffbbbb"
| 1 || Sat 5 || 8:00 || Indiana ||  || 67-69 || Adams (12) || Adams (7) || Robinson (4) || Trinity University  N/A || 0-1
|- align="center" bgcolor="ffbbbb"
| 2 || Wed 9 || 12:00 || @ Indiana ||  || 69-78 || Johnson (15) || Phillips (5) || Johnson (3) || Bankers Life Fieldhouse  5,270 || 0-2
|-

Regular season

|- align="center" bgcolor="bbffbb"
| 1 || Sat 19 || 8:00 || @ Tulsa || FS-SW || 88-79 || Young (20) || Young (13) || Hammon (9) || BOK Center  7,509 || 1-0
|- align="center" bgcolor="ffbbbb"
| 2 || Fri 25 || 7:00 || @ Connecticut || CPTV-S || 79-83 || Adams (21) || Young (9) || Hammon (6) || Mohegan Sun Arena  6,115 || 1-1
|- align="center" bgcolor="ffbbbb"
| 3 || Wed 30 || 8:00 || Chicago || CN100 || 63-77 || Hammon (21) || AdamsAppel (6) || HammonRobinson (5) || AT&T Center  7,233 || 1-2
|-

|- align="center" bgcolor="bbffbb"
| 4 || Fri 1 || 8:00 || Phoenix ||  || 85-66 || Hammon (30) || Appel (11) || Robinson (11) || AT&T Center  6,534 || 2-2
|- align="center" bgcolor="ffbbbb"
| 5 || Sun 3 || 7:00 || @ Minnesota || FS-SW || 79-83 || Adams (21) || JohnsonYoung (7) || Hammon (4) || Target Center  7,942 || 2-3
|- align="center" bgcolor="ffbbbb"
| 6 || Fri 8 || 7:30 || @ Atlanta || SSO || 57-60 || Young (21) || Young (7) || Hammon (4) || Philips Arena  4,501 || 2-4
|- align="center" bgcolor="bbffbb"
| 7 || Sat 9 || 8:00 || Seattle || FS-SW || 80-67 || Adams (13) || Appel (6) || AppelHammonPerkins (4) || AT&T Center  8,187 || 3-4
|- align="center" bgcolor="bbffbb"
| 8 || Sat 16 || 8:00 || Los Angeles || FS-SWKDOC || 98-85 (OT) || HammonYoung (24) || AppelYoung (8) || Hammon (7) || AT&T Center  8,234 || 4-4
|- align="center" bgcolor="ffbbbb"
| 9 || Fri 22 || 10:00 || @ Seattle ||  || 76-82 || Perkins (20) || Johnson (6) || Hammon (6) || KeyArena  6,849 || 4-5
|- align="center" bgcolor="bbffbb"
| 10 || Sun 24 || 8:30 || @ Los Angeles || KDOC || 91-71 || Young (20) || Appel (11) || Hammon (10) || Staples Center  11,301 || 5-5
|- align="center" bgcolor="bbffbb"
| 11 || Thu 28 || 12:30 || Los Angeles || FS-SW || 94-80 || Young (23) || Adams (7) || Hammon (6) || AT&T Center  15,184 || 6-5
|-

|- align="center" bgcolor="bbffbb"
| 12 || Sun 1 || 3:00 || Minnesota || NBATV || 93-84 || Hammon (23) || Young (10) || Hammon (8) || AT&T Center  6,568 || 7-5
|- align="center" bgcolor="bbffbb"
| 13 || Tue 3 || 8:00 || Phoenix || NBATV || 82-81 || Adams (24) || Young (14) || HammonRobinson (4) || AT&T Center  6,912 || 8-5
|- align="center" bgcolor="bbffbb"
| 14 || Thu 5 || 7:00 || @ Indiana || NBATV || 88-72 || Hammon (19) || Adams (10) || Robinson (5) || Bankers Life Fieldhouse  6,088 || 9-5
|- align="center" bgcolor="bbffbb"
| 15 || Fri 6 || 7:00 || @ Washington || NBATVCSN-MA || 78-73 || Young (18) || Appel (7) || Hammon (6) || Verizon Center  6,522 || 10-5
|- align="center" bgcolor="bbffbb"
| 16 || Sun 8 || 4:00 || @ New York || NBATVMSG || 94-81 || Perkins (24) || Young (7) || Robinson (9) || Prudential Center  7,714 || 11-5
|- align="center" bgcolor="bbffbb"
| 17 || Wed 11 || 12:30 || @ Chicago ||  || 77-68 || RobinsonYoung (16) || Appel (5) || Hammon (7) || Allstate Arena  13,161 || 12-5
|- align="center" bgcolor="bbffbb"
| 18 || Fri 13 || 8:00 || Atlanta || FS-SWSSO || 91-70 || Perkins (21) || AppelJohnson (9) || Robinson (7) || AT&T Center  13,426 || 13-5
|-
| colspan="11" align="center" valign="middle" | Summer Olympic break
|-

|-
| colspan="11" align="center" valign="middle" | Summer Olympic break
|- align="center" bgcolor="bbffbb"
| 19 || Fri 17 || 8:00 || @ Tulsa ||  || 89-79 || Young (20) || Adams (8) || Hammon (8) || BOK Center  6,270 || 14-5
|- align="center" bgcolor="bbffbb"
| 20 || Sun 19 || 6:00 || @ Phoenix || FS-SW || 89-47 || Hammon (19) || Appel (10) || Robinson (4) || US Airways Center  10,656 || 15-5
|- align="center" bgcolor="bbffbb"
| 21 || Tue 21 || 8:00 || Washington || NBATV || 75-72 || Hammon (22) || Appel (10) || Hammon (4) || AT&T Center  5,913 || 16-5
|- align="center" bgcolor="ffbbbb"
| 22 || Thu 23 || 10:30 || @ Los Angeles || TWC101 || 77-101 || Robinson (22) || AppelJohnsonRobinson (5) || Robinson || Staples Center  8,696 || 16-6
|- align="center" bgcolor="bbffbb"
| 23 || Sat 25 || 8:00 || Tulsa || FS-SW || 91-71 || Perkins (21) || Johnson (7) || HammonRobinson (6) || AT&T Center  9,025 || 17-6
|- align="center" bgcolor="ffbbbb"
| 24 || Tue 28 || 8:00 || @ Minnesota || NBATV || 84-96 (OT) || Young (19) || Young (6) || HammonRobinson (4) || Target Center  8,532 || 17-7
|- align="center" bgcolor="ffbbbb"
| 25 || Thu 30 || 8:00 || Connecticut  || || 73-84 || Adams (22) || Young (10) || Hammon (8) || AT&T Center  5,023 || 17-8
|-

|- align="center" bgcolor="ffbbbb"
| 26 || Sat 1 || 10:00 || @ Phoenix || NBATV || 90-94 || Young (32) || Young (8) || Hammon (5) || US Airways Center  5,964 || 17-9
|- align="center" bgcolor="ffbbbb"
| 27 || Fri 7 || 8:00 || Indiana ||  || 78-82 || Hammon (15) || Appel (10) || Robinson (5) || AT&T Center  8,097 || 17-10
|- align="center" bgcolor="ffbbbb"
| 28 || Sun 9 || 3:00 || Minnesota || NBATV || 62-81 || Young (20) || YoungAppel (8) || Christon (4) || AT&T Center  6,025 || 17-11
|- align="center" bgcolor="bbffbb"
| 29 || Wed 12 || 8:00 || @ Tulsa ||  || 78-67 || Christon (17) || Appel (11) || Hammon (7) || BOK Center  4,543 || 18-11
|- align="center" bgcolor="bbffbb"
| 30 || Fri 14 || 8:00 || Seattle || NBATV || 90-66 || Hammon (25) || Young (9) || Hammon (5) || AT&T Center  7,109 || 19-11
|- align="center" bgcolor="ffbbbb"
| 31 || Sun 16 || 3:00 || Tulsa ||  || 70-80 || Young (15) || YoungAppel (8) || Robinson (5) || AT&T Center  5,246 || 19-12
|- align="center" bgcolor="bbffbb"
| 32 || Tue 18 || 8:00 || New York || ESPN2 || 77-66 || Robinson (21) || Young (10) || Robinson (5) || AT&T Center  6,650 || 20-12
|- align="center" bgcolor="ffbbbb"
| 33 || Fri 21 || 10:00 || @ Seattle ||  || 75-84 || Adams (16) || Young (11) || AdamsHammon (6) || KeyArena  8,494 || 20-13
|- align="center" bgcolor="bbffbb"
| 34 || Sun 23 || 3:00 || Minnesota ||  || 99-84 || Adams (28) || AdamsChriston (6) || RobinsonSmith (6) || AT&T Center  8,084 || 21-13
|-

| All games are viewable on WNBA LiveAccess or ESPN3.com

Postseason

|- align="center" bgcolor="ffbbbb"
| 1 || September 27 || 10:00 || @ Los Angeles || ESPN2 || 86-93 || Hammon (19) || Appel (7) || Hammon (6) || Galen Center  5,013 || 0-1
|- align="center" bgcolor="ffbbbb"
| 2 || September 29 || 3:00 || Los Angeles || NBATV || 101-94 || Young (28) || Adams (8) || Robinson (5) || Freeman Coliseum  5,293 || 0-2
|-

Statistics

Regular season

Awards and honors

References

External links

San Antonio Stars seasons
San Antonio